Arthur Maybee Chanter was an Australian composer, conductor, music teacher, choir master and musician. An accomplished pianist and watercolorist, Chanter was among the earliest music graduates of the University of Melbourne, where he was instructed by George Marshall-Hall. In 1910 Chanter was the adjudicator of a musical Eistedfodd and band competition of an association of native-born Australians in Western Australia. He married Josephine in 1902 but divorced her in 1914, taking another wife Sara Kate Campbell in 1915. He live mostly in Brighton, Victoria and Elsternwick, but was well travelled. He advocated recording as a means to reach the working clubs and masses and was damning of the teaching methods in public schools. He retired to Euroa and died 28 November 1950, and is buried in Cheltenhan pioneer cemetery.

Works

 1898 The Vintner's Daughter or The Vintner of Wurgburg, an opera in four acts
 1900 Chaucer Songs
 1901 Saltwater Jack
 1910 Valse triste : pianoforte solo 
 1911 A Daughter of Italy, an opera
 1912 Snow clouds : song for soprano  with lyrics by Catherine Cue-Campbell
 1913 Australians all : national song and anthem / words by William Carrington
 1914 Australia my beloved land / words by Randolph Bedford 
 1915 Christmas hymn
 1930 Sorrento : one act comic opera 
 1930 Sun of my soul : hymn anthem 
 There's a woman like a dewdrop : serenade from Browning's 
 The buccaneer for bass voice 
 O worship the Lord for choir 
 The bountiful harvest 
 Take, Oh Take those lips away (from Measure for Measure by Shakespeare)

References

1866 births
1950 deaths
Australian conductors (music)
Australian male composers
20th-century Australian musicians
20th-century classical composers
Australian male classical composers
Australian opera composers
Musicians from Melbourne
20th-century Australian male musicians
20th-century conductors (music)
19th-century conductors (music)
19th-century classical composers
19th-century Australian musicians
Male opera composers
People from Brighton, Victoria
Burials in Victoria (Australia)
University of Melbourne alumni